= Tsahi Vider =

Tsahi Vider (Hebrew: צחי וידר) is an Israeli physician and general surgeon whose work has included general surgery, medical aesthetics, regenerative medicine, and longevity medicine.

Vider studied medicine in Israel and completed postgraduate training in general surgery. He later developed professional interests in medical aesthetics, regenerative medicine, preventive medicine, and longevity medicine.

== Career ==
Vider began his medical career as a general surgeon, with clinical work involving emergency surgery and surgical care.

Vider later expanded his clinical activity to include medical aesthetics, regenerative medicine, and longevity medicine. His aesthetic-medicine work has included non-surgical aesthetic procedures, injectable treatments, energy-based technologies, and physician-led aesthetic care.

Vider is the founder and medical director of Vider Longevity Clinic in Herzliya, Israel. The clinic focuses on physician-led longevity medicine, preventive healthcare, medical aesthetics, regenerative medicine, metabolic health, biological-age assessment, advanced diagnostics, and personalised health programs.

His current clinical work at Vider Longevity Clinic includes longevity-oriented medical assessment, biological and functional ageing evaluation, metabolic and mitochondrial-health evaluation, personalised lifestyle and supplement protocols, and selected regenerative and aesthetic medical treatments.

== Research ==
His later professional interests have included medical aesthetics, longevity medicine, biomarkers of ageing, mitochondrial biology, regenerative medicine, preventive healthcare, and the use of artificial intelligence in healthcare.

Vider has proposed a conceptual framework referred to as the “Energy Theory of Aging,” which emphasizes progressive decline in cellular energy production and mitochondrial bioenergetic function as contributors to age-related functional decline.
